Malá Lehota is a village and municipality in the Žarnovica District, Banská Bystrica Region in Slovakia.

External links
https://web.archive.org/web/20071217080336/http://www.statistics.sk/mosmis/eng/run.html

Villages and municipalities in Žarnovica District